Zoran Zlatkovski (born 5 April 1987) is a Macedonian football coach and former player who played as a forward. He is the president and manager of women's club ŽFK Kamenica Sasa.

Club career
Zlatkovski first club was Bulgarian side Pirin. Between 2005 and 2007 he played in Lokomotiv Plovdiv. In January 2008 Zlatkovski signed with Slavia Sofia.

Managerial career 
In June 2017, Zlatkovski formed a women's football club, ŽFK Kamenica Sasa, of whom he became head coach.

References

1987 births
Living people
People from Makedonska Kamenica Municipality
Association football forwards
Macedonian footballers
North Macedonia under-21 international footballers
OFC Pirin Blagoevgrad players
PFC Lokomotiv Plovdiv players
PFC Slavia Sofia players
OFC Vihren Sandanski players
PFC Ludogorets Razgrad players
Malavan players
FK Bregalnica Štip players
PAS Lamia 1964 players
Panachaiki F.C. players
Akademija Pandev players
Kavala F.C. players
FK Sasa players
First Professional Football League (Bulgaria) players
Persian Gulf Pro League players
Macedonian First Football League players
Gamma Ethniki players
Football League (Greece) players
Macedonian Second Football League players
Expatriate footballers in Bulgaria
Macedonian expatriate sportspeople in Bulgaria
Expatriate footballers in Iran
Macedonian expatriate sportspeople in Iran
Expatriate footballers in Greece
Macedonian expatriate sportspeople in Greece
Macedonian football managers
ŽFK Kamenica Sasa managers